19 Varieties of Gazelle: Poems of the Middle East is a poetry book, by Naomi Shihab Nye. It was a finalist for the 2002 National Book Award, Young People's Literature.

The poems explore the lives of people in the Middle East, in the aftermath of the September 11 attacks.

Publishers Weekly said the book was "an excellent way to invite exploration and discussion of events far away and their impact here at home."

Bibliography
 ; HarperCollins,

References

External links

"Poet Naomi Shihab Nye", "Now", PBS

American poetry collections
Books about the Middle East
September 11 attacks in popular culture
2002 non-fiction books